Cha-uat station is a railway station located in Cha-uat Subdistrict, Cha-uat District, Nakhon Si Thammarat. it is a class 2 railway station, located  from Thon Buri railway station.

Train services 
 Special Express No.37/38 Bangkok-Sungai Kolok-Bangkok
 Rapid No. 169/170 Bangkok-Yala-Bangkok
 Rapid No. 171/172 Bangkok-Sungai Kolok-Bangkok
 Local No. 445/446 Chumphon-Hat Yai Junction-Chumphon
 Local No. 447/448 Surat Thani-Sungai Kolok-Surat Thani
 Local No. 451/452 Nakhon Si Thammarat-Sungai Kolok-Nakhon Si Thammarat
 Local No. 455/456 Nakhon Si Thammarat-Yala-Nakhon Si Thammarat
 Local No. 457/458 Nakhon Si Thammarat-Phatthalung-Nakhon Si Thammarat

References 
 
 

Railway stations in Thailand